This is a list of rivers of Quebec. Quebec has about:
one million lakes of which 62279 have a toponymic designation (a name), plus 218 artificial lakes;
15228 watercourses with an official toponymic designation, including 12094 streams and 3134 rivers.

Quebec has 2% of all fresh water on the planet.

James Bay watershed

James Bay

Rivers flowing into James Bay, listed from south to north
Rivière au Saumon (Baie James)
Rivière au Phoque (Baie James)
Désenclaves River
Roggan River
Corbin River
Anistuwach River
Kapsaouis River
Piagochioui River

Tributaries of La Grande River

Tributaries of Rupert River

Tributaries of Broadback River

Tributaries of Nottaway River

Tributaries of Waswanipi River
(which empties in Nottaway River via Matagami Lake)

Tributaries of Bell River

Quebec rivers flowing in Ontario (or tributaries of Ontario rivers)
Main Quebec rivers flowing up to Ontario bank of James Bay, listed from East to West:

Hudson Bay's tributaries (without James Bay's tributaries)
Main rivers flowing into Hudson Bay, listed from north to south:

Hudson Strait watershed
Rivers flowing into Hudson Strait, listed from west to east:

Ungava Bay watershed
Rivers flowing into Ungava Bay, listed from west to east:

North shore of St. Lawrence River/Gulf of St. Lawrence watershed
Rivers flowing into the St. Lawrence River and Gulf of St. Lawrence, listed in downstream order:

Ottawa Valley (east bank) – upper part

Tributaries of Dozois Reservoir and lower

Tributaries of Decelles Reservoir and lower

Ottawa Valley (Quebec Watershed) – intermediary section (at the Ontario limit)

Ottawa Valley (Ontario Watershed) – intermediary section (at the Quebec–Ontario limit)
 Blanche River (Lake Timiskaming) (through Lake Timiskaming)
 Englehart River (Ont.)
 Misema River (Ont.)
 Little Misema River (Ont.)
 Lillord Creek (Ont.)
 Larder River (Ont.)
 Laberge River (through Hébert Lake, Buies Lake, Raven Lake, Ward Lake) (Ont. and QC)
 Dufay River (through Buies Lake, Raven Lake, Ward Lake) (QC)

Gatineau River Valley – lower part

Gatineau Valley (west bank)

Basse-Laurentides – Lac des Deux Montagnes and rivière des Mille Îles 
Rive Nord, en ordre de l'Ouest vers l'Est:

North shore of Rivière des Mille Îles
 Rivière des Mille-Îles
 Rivière du Chêne
 Rivière du Chicot
 Cachée River (rivière des Mille Îles)
 Rivière aux Chiens
 Mascouche River
 Saint Pierre River
 Saint Pierre River

Ottawa Valley (south bank)

 Rigaud River
 Raquette River (Ottawa River)

Haut Saint-Laurent sector (north bank)

North shore of St. Lawrence River

 Beaudette River
 Delisle River
 Rouge River
 Graisse River

Montreal area
See: List of rivers and water bodies of Montreal Island

Jesus Island (Laval, Quebec)

Note: No rivers on Jesus Island

Island of Montreal
 Saint Pierre River
 Lachine Canal
 Canal de l'Aqueduc
 Sainte-Anne-de-Bellevue Canal

Watershed of l'Assomption River

North shore of St Lawrence river – between Repentigny and Trois-Rivières

Watershed of Saint-Maurice River
Rivers flowing into the Saint Lawrence River and Gulf of Saint Lawrence, listed in downstream order:

West bank

East bank

Gouin Reservoir 
(Clockwise from the mouth)

North shore downstream of Trois-Rivières
 Champlain River
 Brûlée River
 Rivière au Lard (Champlain River)
 Rivière à la Fourche (Champlain River)
 Noire River (Fourche River tributary)

Batiscan River Valley

East of Batiscan River

East of Quebec City on north shore

Watershed of Saguenay River

South shore (from the mouth of Saguenay River)

Saguenay River
Petites Îles River
Saint-Étienne River (Saguenay River)
Saint-Athanase River
Petit Saguenay River
Deschênes River (Petit Saguenay River Tributary)
Portage River (Petit-Saguenay River tributary)
Cabanage River
Saint-Jean River (Saguenay River tributary)
Bras à Pierre
Cami River
Rivière à la Catin
La Petite Rivière (Cami River tributary)
Épinglette Stream
Brébeuf Lake (Saint-Jean River tributary)
Pierre River (Brébeuf Lake)
Bras de Ross (Brébeuf Lake)
Éternité River
Rivière à la Croix (Saguenay River tributary)
Ha! Ha! River (Saguenay River)
Bras d'Hamel
Bras Rocheux
Rivière à Pierre (Ha! Ha! River tributary)
Huard River
Rivière des Cèdres (Ha! Ha! River)
Rivière à Mars
Bras du Coco
Rivière à Mars North-West
Bras de l'Enfer (rivière à Mars)
Bras d'Isaïe
Bras des Mouches
La Grosse Décharge (Mars River tributary)
La Petite Décharge (La Grosse Décharge)
Rivière à Benjamin
Gauthier River (Saguenay River)
Rivière du Moulin (Saguenay River tributary)
Bras de Jacob
Bras Henriette
Bras de Jacob Ouest
Bras Sec (rivière du Moulin)
Rivière aux Rats (Saguenay)
Chicoutimi River
Kenogami Lake
Simoncouche River
Cyriac River
Gilbert River (Cyriac River)
Normand River
Jean-Boivin River
Petite rivière Jean-Boivin
Pikauba River
Ruisseau L'Abbé
Bras des Angers
Apica River
Pika River
Petite rivière Pikauba
Rivière aux Écorces (Pikauba River)
Sawine River
Morin River
Rivière aux Canots (rivière aux Écorces)
Rivière aux Canots Est
Trompeuse River
rivière aux Écorces North-East
rivière aux Écorces du Milieu
Cascouia River
Rivière aux Sables (Saguenay River)
Rivière du Lac Onésime
Dorval River
Bruyère River
La Petite Décharge (Saguenay River tributary)
Bédard River (Saguenay River)
Raquette River (Bédard River)
Petite rivière Bédard

 
North shore (from the mouth of Saguenay River)
Saguenay River
Sainte-Marguerite River
Caribou River (Sainte-Marguerite River tributary)
Bras des Murailles
Boivin River (Bras des Murailles)
Sainte-Marguerite Nord-Est River
Olaf River
Petite rivière des Savanes (Sainte-Marguerite River tributary)
Épinette River
Rivière de la Descente des Femmes
Pelletier River (Saguenay River)
Rivière aux Outardes (Saguenay River tributary)
Rivière aux Foins (rivière aux Outardes tributary)
Rivière à la Loutre (Saguenay River tributary)
Valin River (Saguenay River tributary)
Le Petit Bras (Valin River tributary)
Bras Fournier
Bras des Canots
Saint-Louis River (Valin River tributary)
Bras de l'Enfer (Valin River tributary)
Bras du Nord (Valin River tributary)
Bras de Fer (bras du Nord)
Caribou River (Saguenay River tributary)
Michaud River (Saguenay River)
Rivière aux Vases (Saguenay River tributary)
Bras Cimon
Hood River
Shipshaw River
De la Boiteuse River (via Onatchiway Lake)
Rivière du Portage (Shipshaw River)
Onatchiway River (via Petit lac Onatchiway)
Rivière au Poivre (via Louise Lake)
Beauchêne River (Shipshaw River)
De la Tête Blanche River
Petite rivière de la Tête Blanche
Beauséjour River (Tête Blanche River)
À la Hache River
Rivière de la Petite Hache (via "Lac de la Petite Hache")
Des Huit Chutes River
Rivière des Huit Chutes Est 
Nisipi River
Étienne River (Shipshaw River)
Rivière des Aulnaies (Saguenay River tributary)
Labonté River
Des Habitants River
Rivière à l'Ours (rivière des Aulnaies)
La Grande Décharge (Saguenay River tributary)
Mistouk River
Le Petit Mistouk
Au Sable River (Mistouk River tributary) (via Labrecque Lake)
Aux Harts River
Rivière aux Chicots

Tributaries of Lac Saint-Jean 
In order in hourly turn from Saguenay River.

Tributaries of Péribonka River

North-shore tributaries downstream of Tadoussac

North-shore Betsiamites River and tributaries eastward

North-shore Aux Outardes River and tributaries eastward

North-shore Manicouagan River and tributaries eastward

North-shore Sainte-Marguerite River and tributaries eastward

Tributaries downstream of Romaine River

Tributaries downstream of Natashquan River

Islands of Saint Lawrence River

Salaberry-de-Valleyfield
Saint Charles River (Valleyfield)

Orleans Island

Anticosti Island

Watershed of south shore of St. Lawrence River (between Ontario border and Etchemin River)

Watershed of Haut-Saint-Laurent

Watershed of Richelieu River

Watershed of Yamaska River

Watershed of Saint-François River and Eastern tributaries 

South bank of Saint-François River

North bank of Saint-François River

Grand lac Saint François

Lake Noir (Saint-François River)
 Bisby River
 Coleraine River

East bank of Saint-François River

 Watopeka River
 Stoke River

Tributaries downstream of Saint-François River' mouth

 Lévesque River
 Colbert River
 Landroche River
 Rivière des Frères

Watershed of Nicolet River and Eastern tributaries

Watershed of Bécancour River and Eastern tributaries

Watershed of Gentilly River and Eastern tributaries

Watershed of Chaudière River 
Tributaries of west bank of Richelieu River

Tributaries of east bank of Chaudière River

Watershed of Etchemin River

Gaspesie Peninsula

Watershed of southeast of St. Lawrence River (at east of Etchemin River)

Watershed of South River, Montmagny (French: Rivière du Sud)

Watershed of southeast bank of St. Lawrence River (at east of South River, Montmagny)

Watershed of Rivière du Loup and Eastern tributaries

Watershed of Trois-Pistoles River and Eastern tributaries

Watershed of Rimouski River and Eastern tributaries 
 Rimouski River

Watershed of La Mitis and Eastern tributaries

Northern slope of Gaspésie

Watershed of Gaspé Bay

Watershed of La Malbaie River (Percé) 
 Malbaie River
 La Petite Fourche
 La Grande Fourche
 Beattie River
 Portage River
 Murphy River

Watershed of Chaleur Bay (east of Bonaventure River)

Watershed of Chaleur Bay (west of Bonaventure River)

Restigouche River watershed (left bank – part in Quebec)

Restigouche River watershed (part in New Brunswick)

Watershed of Bay of Fundy (Atlantic Ocean)

Saint John River watershed – higher part (Quebec, Maine and New Brunswick)

North bank of Saint John River

Saint John River – watershed of Madawaska River – Quebec and New Brunswick

Connecticut River – Quebec and New Hampshire 

 Connecticut River, New Hampshire
 Halls Stream, Quebec and New Hampshire

See also 
 List of rivers of Canada
 List of Hudson Bay rivers
 List of rivers and water bodies of Montreal Island
 List of Quebec Water Channels

External links
 Geography of Quebec – Gouvernment of Quebec

References

Quebec
 
Rivers